Donald Merrick (born November 26, 1955) is an American former sprinter.

References

External links
 1975 Pan American 4 x 100 metres relay final

1955 births
Living people
American male sprinters
Athletes (track and field) at the 1975 Pan American Games
Pan American Games gold medalists for the United States
Pan American Games medalists in athletics (track and field)
Medalists at the 1975 Pan American Games